Broken Hill railway station is a heritage-listed railway station located on the Broken Hill line in Broken Hill,  New South Wales, Australia. It was added to the New South Wales State Heritage Register on 2 April 1999.

History
The Broken Hill Crystal Street Railway Station opened on 15 July 1919 when the line opened to Menindee. Until extended further east in 1927, the section was not connected to the rest of the New South Wales Government Railways network.

Broken Hill's first railway connection arrived in 1888, with the Silverton Tramway connecting the city to the South Australian Railways' narrow-gauge system at Cockburn and on to Adelaide via Sulphide Street station. Broken Hill developed into a lucrative location with the mines providing a regular source of traffic.

Although some 50 kilometres from the border, Broken Hill was the border station between New South Wales and South Australia, with interstate trains changing locomotives up until the 1990s in the era of state-owned railway networks.

Services
Until its cessation in November 1989, Broken Hill was the terminus for the Silver City Comet from Orange. It was also the terminus for Australian National's Silver City Limited from Adelaide from December 1986 until 1990.

Today, Broken Hill is served by NSW TrainLink's weekly Outback Xplorer to and from Sydney. NSW TrainLink also operates a daily road coach service to Dubbo (linking with the Central West XPT to Sydney), which leaves from the city's Tourist Information Centre bus terminal.

Journey Beyond Rail Expeditions' weekly Indian Pacific also calls at Broken Hill.

Description 

The heritage-listed main station building is a type 18 design, constructed of brick, steel and glass with a clock tower in 1957.

The original 1919 station survives a short distance away, disused and derelict. The former stationmaster's residence at 265 Wills Street (the former site of the NSW Government Tram Depot) has been privately owned since 1997. Neither building forms part of the modern station's heritage listing.

With the construction of the Trans-Continental Standard Gauge railway in 1969, the station platform was extended to accommodate the new 15-carriage Indian Pacific and a new signal box constructed on the western end of the station building.  With modern centralised train control, the signal box is no longer staffed.

Heritage listing 
The new Broken Hill station is an excellent example of the application of the "modern style" to railway architecture. Very few sites of this scale were constructed at this time, so it is a rare example. It was also one of the most expensive station buildings constructed, reflecting political needs of the time.

The juxtaposition of the now derelict first station building opposite, in pre cast concrete construction (which was a standard country station building) highlights the contrast between the political needs during the Great War and the post-World War II boom. The scale of the newer building belies the potential needs of the station and it is closely aligned to the major Victorian station buildings in design intent (but not in style or construction).

The Broken Hill railway station was listed on the New South Wales State Heritage Register on 2 April 1999 having satisfied the following criteria:

The place possesses uncommon, rare or endangered aspects of the cultural or natural history of New South Wales.

This item is assessed as historically rare. This item is assessed as scientifically rare. This item is assessed as arch. rare. This item is assessed as socially rare.

References

Bibliography

Attribution

Further reading

External links

Broken Hill station details Transport for New South Wales

Buildings and structures in Broken Hill, New South Wales
Easy Access railway stations in New South Wales
Railway stations in Australia opened in 1919
Regional railway stations in New South Wales
New South Wales State Heritage Register
Transport in Broken Hill, New South Wales